Highway 220 is a highway in the Canadian province of Saskatchewan.

It intersects Highway 322 and passes through Uhl's Bay.

References

220